Mikko Rantanen  (born 29 October 1996) is a Finnish professional ice hockey forward and alternate captain for the Colorado Avalanche of the National Hockey League (NHL). He was selected in the first round, 10th overall, by the Avalanche in the 2015 NHL Entry Draft. Rantanen won the Stanley Cup with the Avalanche in 2022.

Playing career

Early career
Rantanen made his professional Finnish SM-liiga debut as a 16-year-old playing with HC TPS during the 2012–13 season. Rantanen had played with TPS from a youth of 14-years old at the under-16 level. In 15 games he recorded three points (two goals and one assist).

Entering the 2014–15 season as the only 17-year-old to play in his third year with TPS, Rantanen signed a two-year extension to remain with the Liiga outfit on 9 October 2014. Through using his big frame and physical play, Rantanen recorded a career-high 9 goals and 28 points in 56 games, also serving as an alternate captain. He also featured for TPS junior club in the post-season recording 14 points in 7 contests to help capture the championship and was given Best Player honours for his efforts.

In his National Hockey League (NHL) draft eligible year, Rantanen was rated as the top European skater at season's end. He was taken tenth overall by the Colorado Avalanche at the 2015 NHL Entry Draft on 26 June 2015.

Colorado Avalanche
On 13 July 2015, Rantanen signed a three-year, entry-level contract with the Avalanche. After attending his first Avalanche training camp, and impressing in the pre-season, Rantanen was announced to have made the opening night roster for the 2015–16 season as an 18-year old on 6 October 2015. On 8 October 2015, he made his NHL debut to open the season with the Avalanche in a 5–4 defeat to the Minnesota Wild. He was used in a depth role and played limited minutes over six scoreless games with Colorado before being sent to the team's American Hockey League (AHL) affiliate, the San Antonio Rampage, on 22 October 2015.

In his AHL debut, Rantanen contributed with his first goal and assist in North America during a 5–1 victory over the Stockton Heat on 24 October 2015. He continued his scoring pace with the Rampage, leading the club in all offensive categories before he was selected to the AHL All-Star Game as the second-youngest participant in the event's modern history. After receiving a three-game recall to the Avalanche, Rantanen was returned to complete the season with San Antonio, becoming just the seventh teenager to reach the 60-point mark, doing so in just 52 games. In finishing sixth in overall scoring, he earned a selection to the Second All-Star Team and shared the Dudley "Red" Garrett Memorial Award alongside Frank Vatrano as the AHL's rookie of the year.

On 11 November 2016, Rantanen scored his first NHL goal 1:03 into the second period in a game against the Winnipeg Jets. The Avalanche would go on to win 3–2 in overtime. He recorded his first NHL hat-trick on 8 February 2017 in a 4–0 win over the Montreal Canadiens.

Rantanen had a breakout year during the 2017–18 season, scoring 29 goals and 55 assists for 84 points in 81 games; only linemate Nathan MacKinnon had more points for Colorado. The team qualified for the 2018 Stanley Cup playoffs as the second wild card team in the Western Conference. Rantanen had four assists as the team was eliminated by the Nashville Predators in six games.

The following season saw Rantanen continue to play at an impressive pace, highlighted by his play during the first few months of the season. By December 2018, Rantanen had earned 50 points and was on pace to score the most points by any player since the 2004–05 lockout. Although his scoring would drop off, Rantanen finished the season with 87 points in 74 games played; a career high. He also led the team in scoring during the team's two-round playoff run.

On 28 September 2019, Rantanen signed a six-year, $55.5 million contract extension with the Avalanche.

On 26 June 2022, the Colorado Avalanche won the Stanley Cup by defeating the Tampa Bay Lightning in six games, giving Rantanen his first Stanley Cup championship.

International play

Rantanen was introduced and developed as a youth in the Finnish national junior under-16 program. He was first selected at an international tournament at the 2013 World U-17 Hockey Challenge, scoring seven points in five contests. He went on to lead the team at the under-18 level with seven points in four games at the 2013 Ivan Hlinka Memorial Tournament before competing in his first full IIHF competition at the 2014 IIHF World U18 Championships.

Rantanen continued his progression within the Finnish junior team in earning selection to the 2015 World Junior Championships in Toronto. Despite a disappointing seventh-place finish, Rantanen contributed with four goals in five games to earn a top-three player on team selection.

During his first North American professional season and while eligible for his final junior tournament, Rantanen was loaned by the Colorado Avalanche to Captain the Finnish junior team as they hosted the 2016 World Junior Championships. While adding a stabilising veteran presence, Rantanen played a supporting role throughout the round-robin stage before stepping up his production in the Semi-final against Sweden and scoring in the Final against Russia to help Finland claim the gold medal and cap his junior career.

Career statistics

Regular season and playoffs

International

Awards and honours

References

External links
 

1996 births
Living people
People from Nousiainen
Colorado Avalanche draft picks
Colorado Avalanche players
Finnish expatriate ice hockey players in the United States
Finnish ice hockey right wingers
HC TPS players
National Hockey League first-round draft picks
San Antonio Rampage players
Sportspeople from Southwest Finland
Stanley Cup champions